The cinnamon-bellied saltator (Saltator grandis) is a passerine bird in the tanager family Thraupidae. It was formerly considered conspecific with the greyish saltator (Saltator coerulescens), but was split as a distinct species by the IOC in 2021. It is found from Mexico to Panama.

In El Salvador, it is well known as dichosofui after the "elaborate" version of its call, which sounds like a drawn-out ¡dichoso fui!, Spanish for "I was happy!"

References

Saltator
Birds of Central America
Birds of Mexico
Birds of El Salvador
Birds described in 1830